"Words" is a song by F. R. David, released as a single in 1982 from his debut album of the same name. The song was a huge European hit, peaking at number one in Germany, Switzerland, Sweden, Austria and Norway. In the spring of 1983, it peaked at number two on the British charts. It also went to number one in South Africa in late 1982, spending 25 weeks on the charts, eventually becoming the No. 1 hit on that country's year-end charts. In Australia, the single peaked at number 12 but spent 41 weeks on the Top 100 in two chart runs throughout 1983 and early 1984.

In 2006, David released a French language duet version of the song with singer Winda, entitled "Words, J'aime ces Mots". The pair also recorded an English duet version.

Track listings
 7" single
 "Words" – 3:31
 "When the Sun Goes Down" – 3:59

 12" maxi
 "Words" – 3:31
 "When the Sun Goes Down" – 3:08

Charts and sales

Original version

Words (Remix '97)

Words '99

Year-end charts

See also
List of European number-one hits of 1982
List of number-one hits of 1982 (Germany)
List of number-one singles of 1983 (Ireland)
List of number-one hits (Italy)
List of number-one singles of 1982 (Spain)
List of number-one singles and albums in Sweden
List of number-one singles of the 1980s (Switzerland)
VG-lista 1964 to 1994

References

1981 songs
1982 singles
1983 singles
1999 singles
2002 singles
2007 singles
Carrere Records singles
Eurodisco songs
European Hot 100 Singles number-one singles
Irish Singles Chart number-one singles
Number-one singles in Austria
Number-one singles in Denmark
Number-one singles in Germany
Number-one singles in Italy
Number-one singles in Norway
Number-one singles in South Africa
Number-one singles in Spain
Number-one singles in Sweden
Number-one singles in Switzerland
Penny McLean songs
Synth-pop songs
Ultratop 50 Singles (Flanders) number-one singles